Hwang Ji-soo (Hangul: 황지수, born March 27, 1981) is a retired South Korean footballer who played with K League Classic side Pohang Steelers. He served under alternative military duties from 2010 to November 2011.

Career statistics

External links
 
 

1981 births
Living people
Association football midfielders
South Korean footballers
South Korea international footballers
Pohang Steelers players
K League 1 players
K3 League players
Sportspeople from Gyeonggi Province